Painkiller is the twelfth studio album by English heavy metal band Judas Priest, released in September 1990. It was the last Judas Priest album to feature long-time lead singer Rob Halford until his return for the 2005 album Angel of Retribution and the first to feature drummer Scott Travis.

Recording and music
Painkiller is the first Judas Priest album to feature drummer Scott Travis, who replaced long-time drummer Dave Holland in 1989. Travis was previously a member of Los Angeles band Racer X and with his heavy use of double kicks, Travis gave Judas Priest a new sound and heavier edge. Painkiller was described as heavy metal and, due to its relatively intense sound, speed metal.

The album was recorded at Miraval Studios, Brignoles, France in early 1990 and mixed at Wisseloord Studios, Hilversum, the Netherlands later that year. It was produced by the band and Chris Tsangarides, marking the first time since 1978's Killing Machine that Judas Priest had not worked with Tom Allom and the first time since 1976's Sad Wings of Destiny that Judas Priest and Tsangarides worked together.

Don Airey was brought in to play keyboards on "A Touch of Evil". In a 2020 interview, Airey revealed that he also doubled most of the album's bass parts on a Minimoog synthesizer, to achieve the album's distinctive bass sound.

Release
Despite the album being finished in March 1990, the album's release was delayed due to the pending, much-publicized subliminal message trial that began on 16 July 1990. The band was the subject of a civil lawsuit alleging their recording was responsible for the suicide attempts of two young men in Reno, Nevada on 23 December 1985. The case was eventually dismissed on 24 August 1990. With the trial behind them, the band finally released the album on 14 September 1990 on LP, cassette and CD.

The album was certified Gold by RIAA in January 1991. A remastered CD was released in May 2001, including a live recording of "Leather Rebel" and a previously unreleased song, "Living Bad Dreams". The album received a Grammy nomination for Best Metal Performance at the 33rd Annual Grammy Awards, losing to Metallica's cover of the Queen song "Stone Cold Crazy".

Reception

Critical reaction to Painkiller has been overwhelmingly positive, especially from the metal community. Steve Huey of Allmusic, praised the album, saying that it was one of Judas Priest's best albums in years adding that "Travis' thunderous (and crisp-sounding) percussive maelstrom lights an immediate fire under the bandmembers' asses; Glenn Tipton and K.K. Downing tear through a crushing, diabolical riff; and Rob Halford starts shrieking like a wicked witch, giving perhaps the most malevolent-sounding performance of his career. It's a startling statement of musical purpose that arrived seemingly out of nowhere, heralding a comeback that rivals George Foreman's." Mikesn of Sputnikmusic gave the album a 5 out of 5, stating that "Painkiller is full of many memorable riffs and leads from Glenn and K.K. Among the finest moments of the album come from the intense riffing combined with Halford's wailing vocals. The songs found on Painkiller are very energetic from start to finish, and each member seems to feed off each other's performances." On metal-archives.com, the album holds an average score of 92% based on 26 reviews.

Most of the album's tracks were performed live on the Painkiller World Tour, with the title track becoming one of the band's concert staples. "Hell Patrol", "All Guns Blazing", "A Touch of Evil", "Night Crawler" and "Between the Hammer and the Anvil" have all returned to the setlist on later tours, while "Metal Meltdown" and "Leather Rebel" were retired after only a few performances in 1990. "One Shot at Glory" and its intro "Battle Hymn" were the only songs on the album that had not been played live until August 2021, when they were included in Judas Priest's set at the Bloodstock Open Air festival.

Rob Halford's departure
Following the tour for this album, singer Rob Halford left the band in May 1992 and maintained little contact with his former bandmates throughout the 1990s. The reason for this was growing tensions within the band, along with Halford's desire to explore new musical territory by creating a new band of his own, Fight. Contractually, Halford was required to leave Judas Priest to allow sales of any Fight material. Judas Priest remained inactive for several years after Halford had gone; however, the band would eventually re-vamp, record, and tour, recruiting new singer Tim "Ripper" Owens in 1996, who would perform on the studio albums Jugulator and Demolition.

Track listing

Personnel

Judas Priest
Rob Halford – vocals
K. K. Downing – guitars
Glenn Tipton – guitars
Scott Travis – drums
Ian Hill – bass (credited but doesn’t play on the album)

Additional musician
Don Airey – keyboards, Minimoog bass on entire album

Production
Produced by Judas Priest and Chris Tsangarides
Engineered by Attie Bauw and Patrice Rouillon
Equipment management by Tom Calcaterra
Recorded and mixed by Tipton, Halford, Downing, and Tsangarides
Remastered by Jon Astley (2001 reissue)
Cover illustration by Mark Wilkinson, based on an original concept by Judas Priest
Original graphics by Peacock Marketing & Design

Charts

Certifications

References

1990 albums
Albums produced by Chris Tsangarides
Albums recorded at Studio Miraval
Columbia Records albums
Judas Priest albums
Speed metal albums